The 2011 FIM Meridian Lifts Swedish Speedway Grand Prix was the second race of the 2011 Speedway Grand Prix season. It took place on May 14 at the Ullevi stadium in Gothenburg, Sweden.

Riders 
The Speedway Grand Prix Commission nominated Thomas H. Jonasson as Wild Card, and Simon Gustafsson and Dennis Andersson both as Track Reserves. The Draw was made on May 13 by stadium manager.

Results 
It was first Grand Prix event which was stopped before holding all heats (after Heat 16). According to "FIM Speedway World Championship Grand Prix Regulations (2011 edition)", points scored before Heat 16 are approved as event results.

Grand Prix was won by Chris Holder (10 points), who beat Greg Hancock (10), Antonio Lindbäck (9) and Janusz Kołodziej (9). Hancock and the defending World Champion Tomasz Gollob becoming Championship co-leader.

Heat details

Heat after heat 
 (71,4) Lindbäck, Bjerre, Sajfutdinow, Jonsson
 (72,0) Crump, Kołodziej, Gollob, Holta
 (71,5) Hancock, Pedersen, Jonasson, Laguta (X/2x)
 (72,7) Lindgren, Holder, Hampel, Harris
 (71,9) Crump, Hancock, Lindgren, Bjerre (F4)
 (72,4) Holder, Kołodziej, Sajfutdinow, Pedersen
 (73,0) Jonasson, Jonsson, Hampel, Gollob
 (72,2) Lindbäck, Harris, Holta, Laguta
 (74,0) Kołodziej, Jonasson, Harris, Bjerre
 (72,4) Sajfutdinow, Hampel, Laguta, Crump (Fx)
 (72,5) Holder, Hancock, Jonsson, Holta
 (72,7) Lindbäck, Gollob, Lindgren, Pedersen (R4)
 (73,7) Gollob, Holder, Gustafsson, Laguta (Bjerre - M)
 (73,9) Sajfutdinow, Jonasson, Lindgren, Holta
 (74,7) Jonsson, Pedersen, Harris, Andersson (Crump - ns)
 (74,5) Hancock, Kołodziej, Hampel, Lindbäck (F3)

The intermediate classification

See also 
 motorcycle speedway

References 

Speedway Grand Prix of Sweden
Sweden
2011